Poul Arne Bundgaard (27 October 1922 – 3 June 1998) was a Danish actor and singer. He is probably best known for his role as the henpecked Kjeld in the Olsen-banden films.

He also appeared in the 1966 spy film Strike First Freddy as the villain, and as the elf Gammel Nok in The Julekalender.

Biography
In addition to having appeared in a large number of Danish films, Bundgaard starred in a number of operettas in the late 1940s until the 1950s, and worked at the Royal Danish Theatre as a singer between 1958 and 1973; however, he focused mostly on acting later on in his career, partly due to stage fright.

He died during the filming of Olsen-bandens sidste stik and Tommy Kenter was used as stand-in for some of the scenes while Kurt Ravn did his voice.

References

External links 
 
 Profile (in Danish) from the Danish Film Database
 Olsenbandenfanclub Deutschland :: Poul Bundgaard als Kjeld Jensen :: (in German)
 Profile (in Danish) from the Danish Film Institute

1922 births
1998 deaths
Danish male film actors
20th-century Danish male opera singers
Danish resistance members
20th-century Danish male actors
Danish male stage actors
People from Gentofte Municipality
Burials at Mariebjerg Cemetery